William Pierce Hoest (February 7, 1926 – November 7, 1988) was an American cartoonist best known as the creator of the gag panel series, The Lockhorns, distributed by King Features Syndicate to 500 newspapers in 23 countries, and Laugh Parade for Parade. He also created other syndicated strips and panels for King Features.

Biography 
Born in Newark, New Jersey, Hoest spent two years in the Navy and studied art at Cooper Union. He started his art career in 1948 as a greeting card designer with Norcross Greeting Cards, continuing in that field until 1951 when he left to become a freelancer. His cartoons soon began appearing in Collier's, Playboy, The Saturday Evening Post and other magazines.

Comic strips
Hoest entered the comic strip community in 1960 with My Son John, for the Chicago Tribune New York News Syndicate. It last two years, ending in 1962.

He then became an assistant on Harry Haenigsen's Penny. After an injury from a 1965 traffic accident kept Haenigsen away from the drawing board, Hoest took over most of the work, although Haenigsen still supervised and signed each Penny strip.

Hoest was one of the cartoonists featured in Think Small, a 1967 promotional book distributed as a giveaway by Volkswagen dealers. Top cartoonists of that decade drew cartoons showing Volkswagens, and these were published along with amusing automotive essays by such humorists as H. Allen Smith, Roger Price and Jean Shepherd.

While working on Penny, Hoest began his cartoons about a bickering couple, The Lockhorns, as a single-panel daily on September 9, 1968, with the Sunday feature launched April 9, 1972. He then took an alternate route with Bumper Snickers (1974), a cartoon series about cars and drivers for the National Enquirer. His King Features comic strip, Agatha Crumm, was published as both a daily and a Sunday strip from 1977 to 1996. What a Guy!, co-created with his assistant John Reiner, was syndicated by King Features from 1987 to 1996.

Laugh Parade
Hired as the cartoon editor of Parade in 1979, Hoest created Laugh Parade for that Sunday supplement magazine in 1980. For Laugh Parade, he ganged together several miscellaneous cartoons, adding  Howard Huge to that mix in 1981.

Hoest was reportedly a diligent cartoonist, putting in ten hours a day at his drawing board. "It is a business, and I have to treat it like a business. I keep busy. That's the way I make my living".

Personal life and death 
He was president of the National Cartoonists Society at the time of his death. Hoest, who lived in Lloyd Neck, Long Island, was 62 when he died of lymphoma at New York Medical Center. He was survived by his wife, Bunny Hoest; his mother, Dorothea Whittinghill of Lloyd Neck; and nine children and stepchildren.

After Hoest's death, John Reiner continued to illustrate all the features, while Hoest's widow, Bunny Hoest, took over the scripting. Reiner recalled:

Awards
Bill Hoest received three National Cartoonists Society awards. The Lockhorns was named the best syndicated panel of 1976 and 1980 by the NCS, and he also won in the gag cartoon division in 1977.

Bibliography
Santa's Little Helpers, A Christmas Story Polygraphic Co of America, 1952.
Think Small Volkswagen, 1967.
The Lockhorns: What's the Garbage Doing on the Stove? Signet, 1975.
Bumper Snickers. Signet: 1976.
The Lockhorns: Loretta, the Meat Loaf is Moving. Signet, 1976.
The Lockhorns: Who Made The Caesar Salad - Brutus?. Signet, 1977.
Hoest Toasties. Tempo Star Books: 1978. 
More Bumper Snickers. Signet, 1979.
The Lockhorns: Is This Steak or Charcoal? Signet, 1979.
Agatha Crumm. Signet: 1980.
Howard Huge. Lyle Stuart, 1981.
The Lockhorns: I See You Burned the Cold Cuts Again. NAL, 1981. 
The Return of Agatha Crumm. Signet, 1982. 
Even More Bumper Snickers. Signet, 1982. 
The Lockhorns: Giant Size. Tor Books, 1984.
The Lockhorns. Tom Doherty, 1990. 
The Lockhorns: What Do You Mean You Weren't Listening? I Didn't Say Anything. Tom Doherty. 2001.

References

External links
Lambiek

1926 births
1988 deaths
American comic strip cartoonists
Artists from Newark, New Jersey
Cooper Union alumni
People from Lloyd Harbor, New York
United States Navy personnel of World War II